The Atlantic News-Telegraph is a daily newspaper published in Atlantic, Iowa, and covering Cass County, Iowa, and the surrounding area. The newspaper is owned by Community Media Group and publishes six days a week, Mondays through Saturdays.

The News-Telegraph received the 1934 Pulitzer Prize for Editorial Writing for "Where Is Our Money?"

External links 
 Atlantic News-Telegraph Website

References

Newspapers published in Iowa
Oskaloosa, Iowa
Publications established in 1871